John Sellars (20 December 1865 – 12 August 1911) was a British sports shooter. He competed in the 1000 yard free rifle event at the 1908 Summer Olympics.

References

1865 births
1911 deaths
British male sport shooters
Olympic shooters of Great Britain
Shooters at the 1908 Summer Olympics
People from Dundalk
20th-century British people